The , or INP-ENSIACET (or A7), is a selective grande école, located in Toulouse, France.

Departments

References

External links
Official website

Technical universities and colleges in France
Toulouse Institute of Technology
University of Toulouse
Universities and colleges in Toulouse
Grandes écoles
Educational institutions established in 1906
Engineering universities and colleges in France
1906 establishments in France